Robert Mort Frayn (May 3, 1906 – August 1, 1993) was an American politician in the state of Washington. He served in the Washington House of Representatives from 1947 to 1957 for District 43. He was Speaker of the House from 1953 to 1955.

References

1993 deaths
1906 births
Washington (state) Republicans
People from Faulkton, South Dakota
Speakers of the Washington House of Representatives
Republican Party members of the Washington House of Representatives
20th-century American politicians